These Systems Are Failing is the thirteenth studio album by American electronica musician Moby and the debut studio album by Moby & The Void Pacific Choir, a musical project formed by Moby with musicians Mindy Jones, Julie Mintz, Joel Nesvadba, Jamie Drake, Jonathan Nesvadba, and Lauren Tyler Scott. It was released on October 14, 2016 by record labels Little Idiot and Mute.

Critical reception

Andrew Dorsett of PopMatters stated "These Systems Are Failing arrives at your ears with all the subtlety and sonic nuance of a brick wall. It would probably sound like this in any format based on the way it was produced, but when listened to as MP3s as most listeners doubtlessly will, its weaknesses are quite literally amplified... Only through brief glimpses is one able to perceive the dystopian present as Moby and company wish for us to see it. As a work of social activism the album is able to at least make a point, but as a work of art, it generally fails to cast the spell".

Track listing

Personnel 
Credits for These Systems Are Failing adapted from album liner notes.

Moby & The Void Pacific Choir
 Moby – engineering, production, writing, instruments, vocals
 Jamie Drake – vocals
 Mindy Jones – vocals
 Julie Mintz – vocals
 Joel Nesvadba – vocals
 Jonathan Nesvadba – vocals, studio assistance, technical support
 Lauren Tyler Scott – vocals
 Jeff Sosnow – vocals

Additional personnel
 Clay Bair – engineering (choir vocal)
 Emily Lazar – mastering
 Mark Needham – mixing
 Ben O'Neill – mixing assistance

Artwork and design
 Melissa Danis – additional camera operation
 Melissa Danis – photography assistance
 Friend of a Friend – design
 Julie Mintz – camera operation (cover and back cover)
 Moby – photography, image processing

Charts

References

External links
 
 

2016 albums
Moby albums
Mute Records albums